DOB-FLY is a recreational designer drug with psychedelic effects. It can be regarded as the alpha-methyl derivative of 2C-B-FLY or the partially saturated counterpart of bromo-dragonfly. Unlike bromo-dragonfly, DOB-FLY is only slightly more potent than DOB itself, with an active dose in humans of around 1 mg.

See also 
 2C-B-BUTTERFLY
 2C-B-DRAGONFLY
 2C-E-FLY
 NBOMe-2C-B-FLY
 TFMFly
 Substituted benzofuran

References 

Bromoarenes
Designer drugs
Psychedelic phenethylamines
Serotonin receptor agonists
Oxygen heterocycles
Heterocyclic compounds with 3 rings